Sä osaat! is the second solo studio album by Finnish singer-songwriter Erin. It was released on 7 June 2013. In its first week of release, the album debuted at number one on the Finnish Album Chart.

Singles

The first single from the album, "Ei taida tietää tyttö", was released on 15 May 2013. The song peaked at number nine on the Finnish Singles Chart.

Track listing

Charts and certifications

Charts

Certifications

References

2013 albums
Erin Anttila albums
Finnish-language albums